"Follow the Crowd" is a song composed by Irving Berlin for the 1914 musical The Queen of the Movies when it was introduced by Frank Moulan.

References

Songs written by Irving Berlin
1914 songs